Patton Farm is a historic farm complex located near Phillipsville, Haywood County, North Carolina. The farmhouse was built about 1880, and is a two-story, three bay by one bay, brick dwelling with Italianate style design elements. It has a gable roof and a 2 1/2-story brick rear ell.  Also on the property are the contributing gambrel roof barn, a small frame woodshed, a smokehouse, and a small board-and-batten dwelling. The Patton Farm was established about 1830.

It was listed on the National Register of Historic Places in 1980.

References

Farms on the National Register of Historic Places in North Carolina
Italianate architecture in North Carolina
Houses completed in 1880
Buildings and structures in Haywood County, North Carolina
National Register of Historic Places in Haywood County, North Carolina